Greg Peterson may refer to:

 Greg Peterson (American football) (born 1984), American football defensive end
 Greg Peterson (Canadian football) (born 1960), football player in the CFL
 Greg Peterson (rugby union) (born 1991), American rugby union footballer
 Greg Peterson "Machinery Pete", American TV host and podcaster

See also
 Greg Petersen, American soccer coach